The 2016 Diamond League was the seventh season of the annual series of outdoor track and field meetings, organised by the International Association of Athletics Federations (IAAF).

The 2016 series saw three changes to the format. One of the two American meetings, the Adidas Grand Prix held in New York, was dropped from the calendar in favour of the Rabat Meeting in Morocco. This was the first meeting on the calendar to be held in Africa, which had previously been the only northern hemisphere continent not represented on the Diamond League. The second major change was an amendment to the point scoring system. The former model of four points for the winner, two for runner-up and one for third was overhauled with a broader points system giving ten to the winner, six the runner-up and progressively fewer points down to sixth place. The system of double points for the event finals was retained. A third change was the compression of the field events – throws and horizontal jumps allowed three attempts for all athletes, then the top four athletes at that point of the competition were permitted an additional three attempts (as opposed to the previous format of all athletes receiving six attempts).

Format

Diamond Race events
The programme for Diamond Race events remained unchanged, with a total of 32 events divided evenly between the sexes. On the track, six running events were included for each of the sexes, from 100 metres up to 5000 metres, and all Olympic hurdles and steeplechase events featured. In the field events, all traditional four jumps were contested and three of the four traditional throwing events were held. Hammer throw remained absent due to restrictions of stadium size. The parallel IAAF Hammer Throw Challenge series catered for that event.

The attempt format for throws and horizontal jumps was amended so that each athlete received three attempts, then the top four athletes received an additional three attempts. This change followed a similar arrangement that was introduced at the 2016 IAAF World Indoor Championships. The announcement of the change received a mixed reaction from athletes and fans.

Points
Performances in each of the Diamond Races events received points according to the finishing position of the athletes. The winner of the Diamond Race is the athlete with the greatest number of points by the end of the series. In the event of a tie on points, the victor is the athlete with the most race wins that year. The series winners receive a Diamond Trophy and US$40,000.

Schedule
The following fourteen meetings are scheduled to be included in the 2016 season:

Results
Events not included in the Diamond League are marked in grey background.

Men

Track

Field

Women

Track

Field

Rankings

Men

Women

Meeting highlights

Doha
There were twelve world leads set at the opening meet of the season in Doha, as well as 4 meeting records at an event which has begun the Diamond League season each of the past 7 years. The women's triple jump proved to be an enthralling contest, as the lead changed hands 5 times between Caterine Ibargüen and Yulimar Rojas over the course of the 6 rounds. The women's pole vault also provided a spectacle as Sandi Morris jumped a height of 4.83 to equal the Diamond League record and set an outdoor world lead. Two Americans, Ameer Webb and LaShawn Merritt, won the men's sprint events, with Webb running 19.85 to go 23rd on the all-time list. All the women's track events had new world leads set, with the most impressive being Almaz Ayana's 3000 metres victory, where she ran less than a second outside her personal best to run the 19th fastest race of all time. In the men's field, Christian Taylor returned to the meet where he came within 25 cm of the world record last year, and won his event with 17.23.

Shanghai
Six world leads were set at this meeting, with five meeting records also falling. Two of the best performances of the night came in the women's 1500 metres and discus throw. Sandra Perković threw 70.88 which although placing 98th on the all time lists, is the second farthest mark this century, behind her throw to win the 2014 European Championships. In the 1500 metres, Faith Kipyegon ran a Kenyan national record to win, with a time that places her just outside the top 25 female 1500 metres runners of all time. Home favourite Gao Xinglong won the men's long jump, beating Rushwahl Samaai on countback. On the track, Justin Gatlin ran his first 100 metres race under 10 seconds this season, to win, beating Qatari Femi Ogunode. The men's 800 metres was won by Ferguson Cheruiyot Rotich, though there was some controversy, as world record holder and Olympic champion David Rudisha and Bram Som, the pacemaker for the race, were left waiting at the start of the race, having expected a recall due to field athletes being on the track when the gun fired.

Rabat
The first appearance of the Rabat leg resulted in ten new meeting records for the African venue, as well as four world-leading performances. The four performances were Caster Semenya's 1:56.64 in the women's 800 m (five hundredths slower than the series record), Almaz Ayana's 14:16.31 in the women's 5000 m (the fifth fastest run ever at that point), an 8:02.77-minute run by Conseslus Kipruto in the men's steeplechase (the fastest ever on African soil) and 7:35.85 in the men's 3000 m by home athlete Abdalaati Iguider (also an African all-comers record). On the track, three further meet records came from Elaine Thompson in the women's 100 m, David Oliver in the men's 110 m hurdles, and LaShawn Merritt in the men's 400 m.

In the field events, South Africa's Rushwahl Samaai cleared  in the men's long jump for a meeting record and the best mark ever achieved in Africa. A throw of  left Piotr Małachowski a comfortable winner in the men's discus in a meet record. In the women's triple jump Caterine Ibargüen had her 33rd straight win.

Eugene
The Eugene meet produced nine world leads, five meet records, three area records, and two series records. The best results came from women's obstacle races. In the 100 m hurdles American Keni Harrison ran the second fastest ever time at 12.24 seconds, three hundredths off Yordanka Donkova's world record from 1988 and a NACAC area record. Ruth Jebet of Bahrain became the second woman to finish the steeplechase in under nine minutes, recording an Asian record of 8:59.97 with Kenya's Hyvin Jepkemoi a close runner-up in an African record of 9:00.01. Faith Kipyegon broke her own Kenyan record with a world lead and meet record of 3:56.41 in the 1500 m. Other world leads on the track came from Muktar Edris (men's 5000 m), Asbel Kiprop (men's mile), Tori Bowie (women's 200 m) and Mo Farah (men's non-Diamond race 10,000 m).

The men delivered the best field performances of that year's Prefontaine Classic. In the men's javelin Ihab Abdelrahman of Egypt threw  for a meet record and equal world lead. Among the women field athletes, discus thrower Sandra Perković was the only repeat winner, with Diamond leaders Levern Spencer and Ivana Španović reduced to runners-up by home athletes Chaunté Lowe and Brittney Reese in the jumps.

Rome
Almaz Ayana had the best performance of the night at 14:12.59 minutes for the women's 5000 m – this was (at one and a half seconds short of Tirunesh Dibaba's world record) the second fastest time ever and a Diamond League record. Caster Semenya equalled her own world lead of 1:56.64 to take her third straight win in the women's 800 m while Janieve Russell ran a world lead of 53.96 seconds in the women's 400 m hurdles. The sole world lead of the men's programme came from Conseslus Kipruto – a final-lap fall by Jairus Birech left Kipruto to his third steeplechase win in 8:01.41 minutes.

In Diamond races, Caterine Ibargüen had her 34th straight win. Bohdan Bondarenko took the lead in the men's high jump with his second win of the series while men's discus leader Piotr Małachowski slipped to sixth on the night (one of his worst placings of recent years). Among the women, Elaine Thompson (100 m), Ekaterini Stefanidi (pole vault), Valerie Adams (shot put) and Sunette Viljoen (javelin) had their second wins of the series to top the rankings.

Birmingham
Six world leads and five meet records resulted from the Birmingham leg. She and Mutaz Essa Barshim (2.37 m in the men's high jump) were the only world leads from the field events. On the men's track Conseslus Kipruto had his fourth straight world lead in a steeplechase meet record of 8:00.12. Asbel Kiprop had a world lead and meet record of 3:29.33 minutes in the men's 1500 m. In the men's 400 m, Kirani James had a meet record run of 44.23 seconds. In non-Diamond Race events, Mo Farah had a 3000 m world lead and British record of 7:32.62, while David Rudisha set an African record for the rarely run 600 m (also a world lead and meet record).

In women's track events, Francine Niyonsaba ran a meet record of 1:56.92 in the 800 m, breaking the series run of Caster Semenya (who was absent). Almaz Ayana's win streak was also broken in her absence, with Vivian Cheruiyot taking the 5000 m. Keni Harrison continued her streak in the 100 m hurdles with a meet record of 12.46 seconds. The upset of the night came in the women's triple jump, with Olga Rypakova ending Caterine Ibargüen's long-standing win streak by a winning margin of five centimetres.

Oslo
The best performance of the 2016 Bislett Games was by Dafne Schippers, whose run of 21.93 seconds in the women's 200 m was a Diamond League record, meet record and a world lead. The mile events delivered the two other world leads of the meet with Kenya's Asbel Kiprop and Faith Kipyegon topping the fields there, each with their third Diamond League win of the year. Sandra Perković also had her third straight win.

In Diamond races, Michael Tinsley's streak was stopped by Yasmani Copello in the men's 400 m hurdles, while the absence of Americans Justin Gatlin (100 m), Christian Taylor (triple jump) and Keni Harrison (100 m hurdles) saw their unbeaten records of the series end. Without Gatlin in the men's 100 m, Andre De Grasse had the first Diamond League win of his career. Joe Kovacs maintained high performance in the men's shot put, going over 22 metres for his second win of the series.

Stockholm
With its overcast conditions, the Stockholm Bauhaus Athletics meet was the first of the year to produce no world leads. Ruth Jebet gave the sole meet record performance at 9:08.37 in the women's steeplechase. Three athletes achieved their first Diamond League wins: Jak Ali Harvey (100 m), Dina Asher-Smith (200 m) and Angelika Cichocka (1500 m). Keni Harrison and Christian Taylor returned to the top of their disciplines to take their third wins of the series, as did Ivana Španović and Renaud Lavillenie. Sandra Perković continued with her fourth victory to remain the only female athlete to go undefeated in the series. National interest came in the form of Susanna Kallur's return in the women's sprint hurdles, following a six-year absence from the sport by the world record holder due to injury.

Monaco
At the Herculis meeting, Caster Semenya was the top performer with a new Diamond League record of 1:55.33 minutes in the women's 800 m. This was also a South African record, meet record and a world lead. The runner-up Francine Niyonsaba also broke her national record at 1:56.24.

Conseslus Kipruto increased his streak to five wins in the men's steeplechase, while Piotr Małachowski (discus) and Caterine Ibargüen (triple jump) managed their fourth wins after one loss. Ekaterini Stefanidi and Valerie Adams took the top of their event rankings in the pole vault and shot put, respectively. Tatsiana Khaladovich of Belarus had her first career win of the series in the women's javelin.

London
The London Grand Prix featured a world record run by Keni Harrison, who ran 12.20 seconds for the 100 m hurdles to beat the old standard from 1988. This proved an emotional moment for world-leader Harrison, who burst into tears on the track; after failing to make the American Olympic team, she had said "only the record will make up for missing out on Rio". Britain's Laura Muir delivered a meet and British record of 3:57.49 minutes to win the women's 1500 m. Two further meet records came through Sandra Perković (her fifth discus win of the series) and Christian Taylor (in his fourth triple jump win and a world lead at ).

Two additional world leads came from Mo Farah (12:59.29 in the 5000 m) and Shaunae Miller (49.55 in the 400 m). Joe Kovacs improved his shot put lead with his third win over 22 metres. Ruth Beitia and Ekaterini Stefanidi also improved their leads with their third and fourth wins, respectively. First career wins on the series came for three men: Gao Xinglong (long jump), Jakub Vadlejch (javelin) and Jimmy Vicaut (100 m). Usain Bolt won a non-Diamond Race 200 m, marking a return to form after injury.

Lausanne
Athletissima was the first meet after the Olympic Games in Rio and the fatigue showed, with no world leads produced.

Orlando Ortega edged Olympic champion Omar McLeod to move to the top of the 110 m hurdles Diamond race. Olympic champion Elaine Thompson took the lead in the 100 m Diamond race with her win. In the women's field events Ivana Španović, Caterine Ibargüen, Valerie Adams and Madara Palameika all won to affirm near unbeatable leads in their events. Francine Niyonsaba won the 800 m in the absence of Olympic champion Caster Semenya. Abraham Kibiwott had his first Diamond League win in the absence of Olympic steeplechase champion Conseslus Kipruto.

Paris
The stand-out performance of the Paris Diamond League came from Ruth Jebet. After a dominant win at the Olympic Games, she turned her attention to breaking the steeplechase world record and duly achieved it with a time of 8:52.78 minutes – this was over six seconds faster than the previous mark set by Gulnara Samitova-Galkina (the only other woman who had run under nine minutes for the event). Genevieve LaCaze set an Oceanian record in sixth. Another fast race was the men's 3000 m, where Yomif Kejelcha won in a world under-20 record of 7:28.19 minutes. A third distance track event was also a highlight: Laura Muir improved her 1500 m national record with 3:55.22 minutes – a world lead, meet record and putting her 13th on the all-time lists.

Moving towards the final, several athletes built unpursuable leads in the series, with wins from Renaud Lavillenie (pole vault), Dafne Schippers (200 m), Keni Harrison (100 m hurdles), Ivana Španović (long jump), Ruth Beitia (high jump) and Sandra Perković (discus). On the opposite scale, four men achieved their first ever series wins: Chris Carter (triple jump), Nicholas Bett (400 m hurdles), Alfred Kipketer (800 m) and Ben Youssef Meïté (who set an Ivorian record in the 100 m).

References

Rankings
2016 Diamond League - standings. IAAF. Retrieved on 2016-09-11.

External links

Official website

Diamond League
Diamond League